Trout Creek is a  tributary of Paint Creek in Oakland County, Michigan, in the United States. Via Paint Creek and the Clinton River, it is a tributary of Lake St. Clair.

Trout Creek flows through the Bald Mountain Recreation Area and is one of two designated trout streams in Oakland County, the other being Paint Creek.

See also
List of rivers of Michigan

References

Rivers of Oakland County, Michigan
Rivers of Michigan
Tributaries of Lake Erie